One Museum Park is a skyscraper in Chicago, United States.   It was designed by Chicago-based architecture firm Pappageorge Haymes, Ltd. and is located in the Near South Side community area.

Overview

One Museum Park is the second-tallest building in the Central Station development, on the south side of Chicago and south of Van Buren Street (NEMA Chicago is the current tallest). It is also the third tallest all-residential building in Chicago after the Legacy at Millennium Park and NEMA Chicago.

Museum Park is a complex of multiple residential towers within the Central Station development at the southern edge of Grant Park, across Lake Shore Drive from Chicago's Museum Campus. Construction of One Museum Park was followed by the 54-story The Grant (formerly One Museum Park West), directly to the west at the corner of Roosevelt Road and Indiana Avenue.

Education
The building is zoned to schools in the Chicago Public Schools.

 South Loop Elementary School
 Phillips Academy High School

See also
List of buildings
List of skyscrapers
List of tallest buildings in Chicago
List of tallest buildings in the United States
World's tallest structures

References

External links 

Official website
Emporis listing
Prairie District Neighborhood Alliance Website
Google Earth Model

Residential buildings completed in 2010
Residential skyscrapers in Chicago
Residential condominiums in Chicago
2010 establishments in Illinois